Marion Power Shovel Company was an American firm that designed, manufactured and sold steam shovels, power shovels, blast hole drills, excavators, and dragline excavators for use in the construction and mining industries. The company was a major supplier of steam shovels for the construction of the Panama Canal. The company also built the two crawler-transporters used by NASA for transporting the Saturn V rocket and later the Space Shuttle to their launch pads.  The company's shovels played a major role in excavation for Hoover Dam, the Holland Tunnel and the extension of the Number 7 subway line to Main Street in Flushing, Queens.

Founded in Marion, Ohio in August, 1884 by Henry Barnhart, Edward Huber and George W. King as the Marion Steam Shovel Company, the company grew through sales and acquisitions throughout the 20th century. The company changed its name to Marion Power Shovel Company in 1946 to reflect the industry's change from steam power to diesel power.

The company ceased to be independent when it was sold, becoming the Marion division of Dresser Industries in 1977. In 1992, Dresser spun off the Marion division and certain other assets into a holding company that eventually became the Global Industrial Technologies, Inc. Global sold the division to longtime rival Bucyrus International for US$40.1 million in 1997. Bucyrus integrated the Marion division's products into the Bucyrus product line, then closed the Marion, Ohio, facility.

History

Marion Steam Shovel Company
The Marion Steam Shovel Company was established by Henry Barnhart, George W. King and Edward Huber in August 1884. While steam shovels had been made prior to this date in the United States, Barnhart persuaded Huber to financially back his design, which incorporated a stronger bucket support than other makes. Barnhart and Huber patented Barnhart's changes under US Patent No. 285,100 on September 18, 1883. One element of Barnhart's design was the use of solid iron rods (hog rings) to support the boom of the shovel, which was stronger than simple chain.

This machine set the record in July 1908 for moving  of earth in 25 eight-hour days after American project management began. Marion built large and small steam shovels for building contractors, railroads and the US Army Corps of Engineers who were building the Panama Canal at the time. The company, from between 1902 and 1911, shipped 112 shovels to Panama for the construction of the canal.

Marion excavators were used during construction of Magnitogorsk Iron and Steel Works in the Soviet Union in 1930s. Marion was the first fоreign machine there, in 1930. Poet Boris Ruchyov wrote the "Ballad of Excavator Marion" [Баллада об экскаваторе Марион] on this occasion.

By 1911 90% of all large bucket steam shovels and draglines were produced in Marion Ohio, which was also the headquarters of Osgood Steam Shovel, Fairbanks Steam Shovel and General Excavating Corporation. (Competitor Bucyrus Steam Shovel was founded  from Marion in nearby Bucyrus, Ohio. The company soon relocated to Milwaukee, Wisconsin after Bucyrus city officials refused to approve expansion plans for the company.)

Towards the end of WWI the company assembled M1918 railway guns utilizing a repurposed M1895 12 inch 45 caliber coastal defense gun. The only remaining example was stored for testing purposes at Naval Surface Warfare Center Dahlgren VA until 2011 when it was moved to Fort Lee, VA for inclusion in the U.S. Army Ordnance Training and Heritage Center.

Marion Power Shovel
In April 1946, the company changed its name to the Marion Power Shovel Company to more closely reflect its products.

Marion built its first walking dragline in 1939 and became a key player in providing giant stripping shovels to the coal industry, being the first to put a long-boom revolving stripping shovel to work in North America in 1911. Marion’s succession of giant shovels, many breaking world size records, starting with The Mountaineer in 1956 which was 16 stories. One shovel load moved approximately 90 tons, which was then one of the world's largest power shovels. Marion's huge power shovel models eventually culminated in the world’s largest: the 1965 Marion 6360. The 6360 at the Captain Mine, Illinois, operated with a 180 cubic yard (138 cubic meter) dipper. With an estimated weight of 15,000 tons (13,600 tonnes), this machine is one of the heaviest mobile land machines ever built.

Marion designed and built the NASA Crawler-transporter used to transport both the Saturn V rocket, as well as the Space Shuttle.

Osgood Company acquisition
In 1955, Marion Power Shovel acquired its crosstown rival, the Osgood Company, which manufactured shovels under the Marion-Osgood and Osgood names. Osgood's product line complemented Marion Power Shovel's, with most of Osgood's product line focusing on shovels, cranes and draglines that were small capacity machines as opposed to Marion's line, which focused increasingly on high end strip mining draglines. Osgood also built road-ready mobile units that used Mack truck undercarriages.

Acquisition and end

The Marion Power Shovel Company was refinanced by management in the late 1960s with only the signature guarantee of the primary stockholder, billionaire Henry Hillman, of Pittsburgh, Pennsylvania and PNC Bank fame. In 1977 Dresser Industries, Inc. purchased Marion Power Shovel for approximately US$250 million. The company grew from 1,500 employees in 1974 to over 3,200 employees by 1978 under the direction of Putt McDowell during the massive growth in coal mining demand of the late 1970s.

By 1992, Dresser Industries decided to exit the production of industrial and mining equipment. The affected assets, including the Marion division, became part of Indresco, a holding company created by Dresser in 1992 and then spun off to Dresser shareholders. On November 1, 1995, Indresco changed its name to Global Industrial Technologies, Inc.

On January 23, 1997 Global Industrial Technologies announced that it was divesting certain assets, including the Marion division. Global Industrial Technologies sold the Marion Power Shovel Company, which had revenues of US$114.4 million in FY 1996, for US$40.1 million to Bucyrus International, Inc. on July 23, 1997. Following the acquisition, Bucyrus International closed Marion Power Shovel Company's Marion, Ohio facility.

Historical corporate files and archives for Marion Power Shovel were split between Bowling Green, Ohio's Historical Construction Equipment Association and the Marion County Historical Society in Marion, Ohio.

References & Sources

Sources

See also
Power shovel
Dragline
Big Muskie
Big Brutus
Marion Steam Shovel (Le Roy, New York)

External links
 Bucyrus International, Marion Power Shovel
 Historical Construction Equipment Association
 Happy Birthday Crawlers, NASA page
 NASA Moveable Launch Pad
 Virtual Tour of the Crawler-Transporter 2 Upgrades, Sept 3, 2014
 

Apollo program
Construction equipment manufacturers of the United States
Defunct manufacturing companies based in Ohio
Articles containing video clips
Marion, Ohio
Panama Canal
Companies established in 1884
Companies disestablished in 1997
Bucyrus-Erie